The Harrisburg City Council is the legislative branch of the city government of Harrisburg, Pennsylvania and consists of seven members elected at-large. The council president is elected by the council members and presides over city council meetings. In the event of illness or absence of the president, the vice president presides over the meetings. Each member's term is four years, serving part-time. There are no limits on the number of terms a member may serve.

Legislative process
Every proposed ordinance is initially in the form of a resolution introduced by a council member. Before a resolution can be enacted, it must be referred by the president of the council to an appropriate standing committee, considered at a public hearing and meeting, reported out by the committee, printed as reported by the committee, distributed to the members of the council, and made available to the public. Passage of a bill requires the favorable vote of a majority of all members. A resolution becomes law upon the approval of the mayor. If the mayor vetoes a bill, the council may override the veto by a two-thirds vote. City Council also confirms all department directors and certain other mayoral appointees.

City Council considers and evaluates legislative concerns consisting of committees on:
 Administration
 Budget and Finance
 Building and Housing
 Community and Economic Development
 Children and Youth
 Parks and Recreation
 Public Safety
 Public Works

City Council members

Key to Chart
† President of Council

Former members

See also
List of mayors of Harrisburg

References

City Council
H